Fionn Miguel Eckardt Ferreira (from Ballydehob, County Cork, Ireland) is an Irish inventor, chemistry student and Forbes 30 under 30 listee. He is known for his invention of a method to remove microplastic particles from water using a natural ferrofluid mixture.

Early life 
Fionn Ferreira, whose full name is Fionn Miguel Eckardt Ferreira, was born in Cork to boat-builder and modeller Anne Eckardt, from Germany and West Cork, and boat-builder Rui Ferreira from Portugal, who had met in the UK in 1994 and settled in Ballydehob, County Cork. He was brought up in Ballydehob and attended St James' primary school in Durrus and subsequently Schull Community College in Schull, completing school, at the age of 18, in 2019.

Ferreira spent part of his childhood kayaking around remote coastal areas of Ireland with his dog India, noticing an increasing amount of plastic washing up on the coastline. He created a methodology to quantify and collect plastic pollution, with a focus on microplastics. He built several inventions using LEGO, bits of wood and some microcontrollers to test for these microplastics. He entered the national science fair, the BT Young Scientist and Technology Exhibition, three times, with two of his projects being Let Sanils do the cleaning, An investigation into the antioxidant concentration of different berries using the Briggs-Rauscher reaction in conjunction with a photometer and An investigation into the removal of microplastics from water using ferrofluids. Ferreira worked as a curator at Schull's planetarium.

Microplastic removal technology 
Ferreira designed and tested a method to remove microplastics from water, following what he described as thousands of failed attempts. Ferreira has stated that he was inspired by an article by Fermilab physicist Arden Warner, who developed a new approach to cleaning up oil spills, using magnetic principles, and made a device that uses a magnet-based method to remove the particles from water with extraction rates of 87% (+/- 1.1%). The highest extraction rates observed in Fionn's experiments were for polyesters. He first exhibited the project at the Young Scientist and Technology Exhibition 2018 where he was awarded the Intel Award, best in category, Intellectual Ventures Award and a first-place award. Ferreira subsequently exhibited at ISEF 2018 winning the 1st place American Chemical Society award, 2nd place award in Chemistry, 1st place for Drug Chemical and associated technologies, a scholarship to the University of Arizona and a certificate of honourable mention by the American Statistical Association.

In 2019, Ferreira exhibited at the 2019 Google Science Fair winning the global grand prize award of $50,000.

Education 
In autumn 2019, Ferreira started a BSc in Chemistry at the University of Groningen in the Netherlands, which he continues.

Business 
In 2020, Ferreira founded a business, Fionn & Co., focused on microplastic removal technology. In 2020 and 2021 his work was featured by the global campaign by Hewlett-Packard: For every dream.

Recognition 
In 2018 the MIT Lincoln Laboratory named a minor planet after Ferreira, following his being awarded 2nd place at the Intel International Science and Engineering Fair. In 2021 he was named a National Geographic Society Young Explorer; he has since been working on a new platform for youth in the space of invention with the help of the funding from the society. In 2021, he was named a Forbes 30 Under 30 listee in the Science and Healthcare category. In September 2021 Ferreira was awarded a Premio Internationale Giuseppe Sciacca award for his conservation and ecological efforts. 

Ferreira has spoken at several events, including:
 2020 World Economic Forum
 2019 Global Plastic Health Summit
 2020 Smithsonian Institution Earth Optimism Summit
 2020 GreenTech Festival Berlin
 2021 Regeneron Pharmaceuticals ISEF
 2021 Young Plastic Pollution Challenge 
 2021 And Leuven (conference)
 2021 Viva Technology
 2021 Infoshare conference Poland

References

External links 
 
 Interview and summary of invention concept
 Interview on invention process with BBC

2000 births
People from County Cork
Ocean pollution
Irish scientists
21st-century Irish scientists
Living people